
Gmina Ostrowice was a rural gmina (administrative district) in Drawsko County, West Pomeranian Voivodeship, in north-western Poland.

The gmina contained part of the protected area called Drawsko Landscape Park. The gmina was divided between Gmina Drawsko Pomorskie and Gmina Złocieniec on January 1, 2019, because of bankruptcy, being the first municipality to do so in Poland.

Villages
Gmina Ostrowice contained the villages and settlements of Bolegorzyn, Borne, Chlebowo, Cieminko, Dołgie, Donatowo, Drzeńsko, Grabinek, Gronowo, Grzybno, Jelenino, Jutrosin, Kania Górka, Karpno, Kiełpin, Kleszczno, Kołatka, Kolno, Kosobądź, Marysin, Miłobądź, Nowe Worowo, Ostrowice, Płocie, Przystanek, Przytoń, Siecino, Śmidzięcino, Smołdzęcino, Śródlesie, Szczycienko, Szczytniki, Tęczyn, Węglin and Wiercienko.

Neighbouring gminas
Gmina Ostrowice was bordered by the gminas of Brzeżno, Czaplinek, Drawsko Pomorskie, Połczyn-Zdrój, Świdwin and Złocieniec.

References

Polish official population figures 2006

Ostrowice
Drawsko County